Harry Hewett was a member of the Wisconsin State Assembly.

Biography
Hewett was born on March 4, 1867, in Essex County, New York. Later, he moved to Clark County, Wisconsin.

Career
Hewett was elected to the Assembly in 1918. Additionally, he was Sheriff of Clark County and a member of the Clark County Board of Supervisors. He was a Republican.

References

People from Essex County, New York
People from Clark County, Wisconsin
County supervisors in Wisconsin
Republican Party members of the Wisconsin State Assembly
Wisconsin sheriffs
1867 births
Year of death missing